Duchess Auguste may refer to:

 Duchess Auguste of Württemberg (1734–1787), married to Karl Anselm, 4th Prince of Thurn and Taxis
 Auguste of Schleswig-Holstein-Sonderburg-Glücksburg (1633–1701)